Roma Bălți is a Moldovan football club based in Bălți, Moldova. Club was founded in 1994 and played 3 seasons in Moldovan National Division, the top division in Moldovan football.

Achievements
Divizia B
 Winners (1): 1995–96

References

External links
 Roma Bălți at Weltfussballarchiv
 Roma Bălți at soccerway

Football clubs in Moldova
Association football clubs established in 1994